Jitendra Mohan Hans is an Indian Otorhinolaryngologist, medical researcher and the inventor of HANS speech valve for speech rehablitation after laryngeal cancer surgery. He is a founder member of the Cochlear Implant Group of India and has been a part of the Defence Research and Development Organisation (DRDO) sponsored project team that developed an indigenous Bionic Ear in 2014. Born on 27 November 1955, he graduated in medicine from the University of Meerut in 1978 He has served as the Honorary ENT Surgeon to the Prime Minister of India and is a government nominee at Ali Yajur Jung National Institute for Deafness, Mumbai and the All India Institute of Speech and Hearing, Mysore. He is reported to have pioneered the minimally-invasive surgical techniques for cochlear implants and is a member of the advisory boards of the Union Public Service Commission and World Health Organization (WHO). The Government of India awarded him the fourth highest civilian honour of the Padma Shri in 2005, for his contributions towards medicine.

References 

1955 births
Living people
Recipients of the Padma Shri in medicine
Indian otolaryngologists
Indian medical researchers
20th-century Indian inventors
20th-century Indian medical doctors
Medical doctors from Delhi
20th-century surgeons